The 1993 Vancouver 86ers season was the club's eighth year of existence (or 19th if counting the NASL Whitecaps), as well as their first as a Division 2 club in the franchise model of US-based soccer leagues. After their championship 1992 CSL season, the CSL folded and the Whitecaps joined the American Professional Soccer League for the 1993 season. They continued the tradition of excellence from the CSL capturing the Commissioner’s Cup (regular season) but losing the playoff semifinal in a shootout to the Los Angeles Salsa.

The 86ers also changed their colours from yellow/red/blue to white/black/red and created a new logo of a soccer ball striking a goal net. They were familiar with the league's teams as two others were Canadian teams (Toronto Blizzard and the Montreal Supra resurrected as Montreal Impact), Vancouver lost a 1992 North American Club Championship series to the 1992 APSL Champion Colorado Foxes, and Vancouver had played preseason matches against Seattle Sounders, Los Angeles, and San Francisco based teams through the CSL years.

Schedule and results
The competition was a single table on the league principle with a balanced schedule home and away where each of the seven teams plays the other six four times.  The league`s regular season was played over twenty weeks, beginning April 30 and concluding September 12. The top four in the table qualified for a single-elimination tournament held in September.  The league was a generally close competition, given the unique points system adopted all teams were still in the playoff race into early August or about 70% of the season.  The unique rules includes 6pts for a win, 4pts for a shootout win, 2pts for a shootout loss, and bonus points for goals to a maximum of three.  If the game was tied instead of following FIFA rules of two sudden death thirty-minute extra halves followed by penalty kicks, the APSL did two 7.5 minute extra halves followed by the NASL shootout.  The shootout consisted of the player starting at midfield, goalkeeper in net, and five seconds for the player to score (essentially a timed five second break-away skills competition).  In 1993 before the USSF chose MLS as Division 1, a couple teams had significant capital backing, had local TV and radio deals, and many of the players were US national team hopefuls or Canadian internationals.  Game day rosters had to have eleven of the eighteen as domestic players.

The 86ers were at the top of the table most of the year with a significant lead in the league table until the last six games.  At the start of the season, until the sixth match versus Ft. Lauderdale,  the team was without its coach, Bob Lenarduzzi, and six members of the Canada men's national soccer team as they were in the national team camp and playing 1994 FIFA World Cup qualifying games.   Due to Canada's loss to Mexico 1–2 in World Cup qualifying and subsequent second place final round finish, the 86ers were also missing players for the CONCACAF–OFC play-off versus Australia at the end of the season during the start of their swoon in league results.  To save on travel costs, the teams played back-to-back on consecutive days, for example the games versus the Tampa Bay Rowdies were the day after Ft. Lauderdale Strikers games all season.  At the end of the season the 86ers allowed a number of late goals extending games as draws were not officially recognized including in the playoff game where they were eliminated in an NASL style shootout.

Tables
Points:
Win: 6
Shoot out win: 4
Shoot out loss: 2
1 bonus point per goal scored in regulation, maximum of 3 per game

Expanded table

Pre-season

Source

These games were sixty-minute exhibitions, not full ninety-minute contests.

APSL

Results by round

Post-season

Current roster

Goalkeeper stats

Note: Minutes played and saves statistics are incomplete (see notes below).

Player statistics

External links
 
 American Soccer History Archives – 1993

References

Vancouver Whitecaps (1986–2010) seasons
Vancouver 86ers
1993 in Canadian soccer